There are quite a number of festivals and traditions in Catalonia (Spain). While most are of ancient origin, certain traditions are of relatively recent introduction. There are also some that are common to the whole Catalan society, but others are relevant only to a particular location. Generally, locals welcome outsiders to share with them in their celebration.

Festivals and celebrations
The correfocs, in which "devils" play with fire close the onlookers, is one of the most striking of the Catalan festive events. The devils are not considered the incarnation of evil; they are sprightly and festive characters, dancing to the sound of drums and the traditional gralla, while they set off their fireworks.

Another tradition occurs during the spring festival day of Sant Jordi (St George's Day, 23 April), in which men give roses (mostly in a deep red color) to women, and women give a book to men as a present. That day is also known as "Dia del Llibre" (Book Day), coinciding with the anniversaries of the deaths of William Shakespeare, Miguel de Cervantes and Josep Pla. The streets are full of people gathering around book and flower stands.

Perhaps the most spectacular of the Catalan festivals are those of the colles castelleres, groups of enthusiasts who form impressive human towers (up to ten people high). This is an old tradition of the Tarragona region, which has now spread to many parts of Catalonia, and has become a real spectacle, or sport, that attracts thousands of people. Amongst other important festivities are the carnivals over all the region, especially in Sitges, Solsona, Tarragona and Vilanova i la Geltrú, and the Patum in Berga.

In Catalonia, there are a few local Christmas traditions; one of them is the popular figure of the Tió de Nadal. Another custom is to put up a "Pessebre" Nativity scene, which often includes the Caganer, a figurine depicted in the act of defecation. It is also traditional to hang small branches of mistletoe (vesc) above the doors.

Traditionally, all Catalan men and women are named after a Christian saint, Virgin or Biblical personality. Besides celebrating birthdays, Catalan people used to celebrate their given name saint's day, according to the General Roman Calendar.

The Catalan "Diada" or National Day of Catalonia is on 11 September, after the defeat and surrender of Barcelona to the French-Castilian army of Philip V of Spain and his supporters during the War of Spanish Succession. Similarly 7 November is also remembered in Northern Catalonia after the Treaty of the Pyrenees.

Dance and music
 
Among the musical traditions, there is the very special music of the cobles, the wind bands that play sardanes. The sardana is a circular, open dance, that originated in the Empordà region (north of the country by the Mediterranean sea) and the Pyrenees (Catalan Pirineus), and is now danced in many squares and streets all over Catalonia.

Popular folk songs include "El Rossinyol", "La Balanguera", "La Santa Espina", "Virolai" and "El Cant dels Ocells". Some of them became something like unofficial national anthems under the years of General Franco's dictatorship. Some of those songs became popular all over the world with the success of the Orfeó Català choir around the beginning of the 20th century. Another song, created by the present singer Lluís Llach, L'Estaca, also gained sudden recognition as expressing the national feeling of Catalans. Despite its relative recent introduction, singing l'Estaca became a kind of tradition.

Another important Catalan musical tradition is the singing of Havaneres and burning rhum together at the Cremat which often happen simultaneously.

Culinary traditions

There are a number of Catalan culinary traditions, some of them coincide with a religious festival, like cooking a big Christmas Day meal on 25 December which includes escudella i carn d'olla. St. Stephen's Day on 26 December is a holiday in Catalonia. It is celebrated right after Christmas, with another big meal including canelons stuffed with the ground remaining meat of the previous day. These events are usually celebrated along with kin and close friends.

Other religious event related foods include the Panellets sweets eaten on All Saints' Day and the Bunyols de Quaresma puffy little buns eaten to celebrate Lent.

One of the most representative Catalan gastronomy-centered events is the Calçotada. This is a group event where a certain type of tender onions (calçots) are barbecued outdoors, among much feasting and merrymaking with family and friends.

Similar occasions may be the Costellada and the Botifarrada, where mutton ribs or botifarra sausages are barbecued. Sometimes people also get together to roast pine kernels or chestnuts; the latter is known as "Castanyada", and it is a favoured event in the fall.

The Vermut is a tradition, of having a light aperitif with olives and potato chips before the Sunday meal (formerly after going to church) together with family and friends.

An important tradition in rural areas of Catalonia is the pig slaughter (Matança del porc). Although it has declined in importance owing to strict sanitary European Community rules and public sensitivities, it is still celebrated in certain villages, like La Cellera de Ter, Artesa de Segre, Vall-de-roures, Passanant and La Llacuna.

Other events
Mushroom hunting is a popular activity in Catalonia, where a mushroom hunter is called boletaire. There is a tradition of going to hunt mushrooms as a family or group in the fall, after the rains marking the end of the summer season.

In Catalonia, sport often has a strong national and political connotation. The Barça football team and the USAP Perpignan rugby team are often considered, especially by some Catalan nationalists, to act as unofficial national teams of Catalonia.

Holidays and festivities in Catalonia

Images of traditional celebrations

See also
 Auca (cartoon)
 Catalan symbols

References

External links

Traditions in Catalonia

Catalan culture